Frontera Hidalgo is a town and one of the 118 municipalities of Chiapas, in southern Mexico.

As of 2010, the municipality had a total population of 12,665, up from 10,902 as of 2005.

As of 2010, the town of Frontera Hidalgo had a population of 3,519. Other than the town of Frontera Hidalgo, the municipality had 14 localities, the largest of which (with 2010 populations in parentheses) were: Ignacio Zaragoza (2,464) and Texcaltic (1,743), classified as rural.

Sister cities
  Campobasso, Molise, Italy

References

Municipalities of Chiapas